This is a list of programs broadcast by CNBC. CNBC is an American basic cable, internet and business news television channel owned by NBCUniversal News Group, a division of NBCUniversal, which is owned by Comcast. It was originally established on April 17, 1989 by a joint venture of NBC and Cablevision as the Consumer News and Business Channel.

Current programming

Weekday programs
Closing Bell
Fast Money
Mad Money
Power Lunch
Squawk Box
Squawk on the Street
Street Signs Europe
TechCheck
The Exchange
The News with Shepard Smith
Worldwide Exchange

Primetime programs
American Greed
Jay Leno's Garage
Money Court 
No Retreat: Business Bootcamp

Former programming

Weekday programs
America Now
Before the Bell
Bull Session
Bullseye
Business Center
Business Insiders
Business Tonight
The Call
Capitol Gains
CNBC Sports
The Edge
Kudlow & Company
Kudlow & Cramer
Market Watch: is a show on CNBC that aired from 10am to 12 noon ET since 19 January, 1998, hosted by Felicia Taylor and Ted David (for the first hour)., and Bob Sellers and Consuelo Mack (for the second hour).  It was replaced by Midday Call on 4 February 2002  The show gave viewers the latest business news during the morning trading session.  Regular segments included Taking Stock, where viewers could phone-in and ask the guest analysts' recommendations on certain stocks.
Market Wrap
The Money Club
The Money Wheel
Morning Call
NBC Nightly News
The News with Brian Williams
The News with Shepard Smith
On the Money
Squawk Alley
Steals and Deals
Street Signs
Today's Business
Wake Up Call

Primetime programs
Adventure Capitalists (2016–17)
American Greed: Biggest Cons (2020)
Back in the Game (2019)
Billion Dollar Buyer (2016–18)
Blue Collar Millionaires (2015–17)
The Car Chasers (2013–15)
Cash Pad (2019)
Cleveland Hustles (2016)
Consumed: The Real Restaurant Business (2015)
Crowd Rules (2013)
Deadly Rich (2018–19)
Deal or No Deal (2018–19)
The Deed (2017–18)
The Deed: Chicago (2017–20)
Empires of New York (2020)
Fast Money MBA Challenge (2007)
The Filthy Rich Guide (2014–17)
Five Day Biz Fix (2019–20)
Follow the Leader (2016)
The Job Interview (2017)
Listing Impossible (2020)
Make Me a Millionaire Inventor (2015–16)
Money Talks (2014)
The Partner (2017)
The Profit (2013–21)
Restaurant Startup (2014–16)
Secret Lives of the Super Rich (2013–19)
Staten Island Hustle (2018)
Streets of Dreams with Marcus Lemonis (2021)
Super Heists (2021)
Treasure Detectives (2013)
West Texas Investors Club (2015–16)

References

CNBC